The 2016 North East Lincolnshire Council election took place on 5 May 2016 to elect members of North East Lincolnshire Council in England. This was on the same day as other local elections.

Council make up
After the 2016 local election, the  political make up of the council was as follows:

Labour remained in minority control of the authority, despite losing one seat (Park) to the Liberal Democrats and failing to regain the East Marsh seat they lost to UKIP in a by-election the previous year, which was gained by the Liberal Democrats as UKIP didn't field a candidate in that ward. These were the first gains by the Liberal Democrats in the borough since the 2008 local elections, prior to being almost wiped out over the next four years.

Since the previous year's elections, two UKIP councillors (Matthew Stinson and Stephen Harness) resigned from their party and sat as Independents, and would go on to join the Conservatives, while Ron Shepherd by this point had already defected directly to the Conservatives and successfully defended his seat in Scartho at these elections in the process.

Shortly after these elections took place, a by-election was held to fill the vacancy in the South ward in June 2016 due to the resignation of councillor Chris Stanland in the South ward. Although he resigned before these local elections, it happened after close of nominations. Labour held the seat and thus increased their number of councillors to 19.

Ward results

Croft Baker

East Marsh

Freshney

Haverstoe

Heneage

Humberston & New Waltham

Immingham

Park

Scartho

Sidney Sussex

South

Yarborough

References

2016 English local elections
2016
2010s in Lincolnshire